Simmias was a Greek officer in the service of Ptolemy III Euergetes, king of Egypt, who was sent by him to explore the shores of the Red Sea and the coasts of Ethiopia. Much of the information recorded by the geographer Agatharchides was derived from his authority.

See also
Hippalus
Eudoxus of Cyzicus
Periplus of the Erythraean Sea

References

(Diod. iii. 18.)

Ancient Greek explorers
Ancient Greeks in Africa
People of the Ptolemaic Kingdom
3rd-century BC Greek people
Explorers of Africa